is a metro station located in Tsuzuki Ward, Yokohama, Kanagawa Prefecture, Japan. It is served by the Yokohama Municipal Subway’s  Green Line (Line 4) and is 7.4 kilometers from the terminus of the Green Line at Nakayama Station.

History
Kita-Yamata Station opened on March 30, 2008, when the Green Line started operation.

Lines 
Yokohama Municipal Subway
Green Line

Station layout
Kita-Yamata Station has a single underground island platform serving two tracks located four stories underground.

Platforms

Surrounding area
Yokohama International Swimming Pool
Salesio Gakuin High School

References

External links
 Kita-Yamata Station (Japanese)

Railway stations in Kanagawa Prefecture
Railway stations in Japan opened in 2008
Green Line (Yokohama)